Alejandra Patricia Segura Maldonado (born ) is a Mexican volleyball player. She is a member of the Mexico women's national volleyball team. 

She was part of the Mexico national team at the 2014 FIVB Volleyball Women's World Championship in Italy. On the club level, she played for Nuevo León in 2014.

Clubs
  Nuevo León (2014)

References

External links
http://www.scoresway.com/?sport=volleyball&page=player&id=11077
http://worldgrandprix.2016.fivb.com/en/group3/competition/teams/mex-mexico/players/alejandra-patricia-segura-maldonado?id=51101
https://web.archive.org/web/20150807082436/http://dezaguero.com/2013/10/06/rumbo-al-mundial-sub23-alejandra-segura/

1993 births
Living people
Mexican women's volleyball players
Sportspeople from Mexico City